Rutherford B. Hayes High School is a public high school in Delaware, Ohio, United States.  It is the only high school in the Delaware City School District.  The school's mascot is the Pacer, a tribute to the Little Brown Jug, which takes place in Delaware. The school is named after President Rutherford B. Hayes, who was born in Delaware in 1822.

Music program

Hayes has an extremely active and accomplished music department. The Hayes orchestra performed at Carnegie Hall in March 2010 and again in 2014 and has received superior ratings at State competitions for many consecutive years. In 2017 the marching band went to Ireland to perform at a Saint Patrick's Day Parade. The Delaware Hayes Grand Pacer Marching Band qualified for State in the Ohio Music Education Association (OMEA) competition in 2010 and performed at the Outback Bowl in December 2011 and January 2020. The marching band also went on to qualify for State Competition at all three contests in 2012. It received a superior rating of I at qualifying contests and the State Finals, and has qualified for OMEA State Competition every year since 2012. The Marching band then again in 2017 earned a 1 at State competition, performing their show "Lost In The Woods". The marching band also earned a 1 at OMEA state competition, performing their show "Oddly Enough" and "Villains". The marching band has also performed at the 2019 Ohio State University Skull Session and the Ohio State Buckeye Invitational. 

The Color Guard also went undefeated in their seasons in 2012.

The Concert band qualified for the Ohio Music Education Association State competition after receiving straight superior ratings at district competition in 2011. Both the marching and concert band received an Excellent rating at the Ohio Music Education Association State competition in 2010–2011.

The Hayes Symphonic Choir performed in New York City with Eric Whitacre in April 2011 and received many superior ratings at the District and State levels along with Women's Chorale.

Hayes has an active Tri-M Music Honor Society chapter who also implements a plastic recycling project. Hayes has many music students that are members of honors groups like the Ohio Capital Conference Honor Choir, East Central Regional Orchestra, Muskingum University Youthfest, OMEA District 10 Honors Band, Columbus Symphony Youth Orchestra, Columbus Symphony Cadet Orchestra, Ohio University Honor Choir and Orchestra, Youth Philharmonic of Central Ohio, Ohio State Orchestra, Central Ohio Symphony Young Strings, and the Ohio Wesleyan University President's High School Music Festival.

Athletics
Delaware Hayes is a member of the Ohio High School Athletic Association (Division 1 for most sports) and part of the Ohio Capital Conference's Capital Division.

State Championships
Boys' Lacrosse (Club Division) - 2012, 2013

Sports rivalries
Some of the Pacers' athletic rivals include the Buckeye Valley Barons, also based out of Delaware County.

See also
Delaware City School District
Delaware, Ohio

References

External links
 District website

High schools in Delaware County, Ohio
Public high schools in Ohio
Buildings and structures in Delaware, Ohio